Depressogryllus is a genus of crickets in family Gryllidae.

Taxonomy
The genus contains the following species:
Depressogryllus depressiceps (Ebner, 1935)

References

Gryllinae
Orthoptera genera